This is the list of the number-one singles of the UK Singles Downloads Chart during the 2010s. , 379 different singles have topped the chart during the 2010s, 26 of which have returned to number one they are: "OMG" by Usher featuring will.i.am, "Just the Way You Are" by Bruno Mars, "Someone Like You" by Adele, "Moves Like Jagger" by Maroon 5 featuring Christina Aguilera, "We Found Love" by Rihanna featuring Calvin Harris, "Somebody That I Used to Know" by Gotye featuring Kimbra, "Payphone" by Maroon 5 featuring Wiz Khalifa, "Impossible" by James Arthur, "Blurred Lines" by Robin Thicke featuring T.I. and Pharrell Williams, "Counting Stars" by OneRepublic, "Happy" by Pharrell Williams, "Waves" by Mr Probz, "Uptown Funk" by Mark Ronson featuring Bruno Mars, "What Do You Mean?" by Justin Bieber, "I Took a Pill in Ibiza" by Mike Posner, "Rockabye by Clean Bandit, "Human" by Rag'n'Bone Man, "Shape of You", by Ed Sheeran and "Symphony", Clean Bandit, "Despacito" by Luis Fonsi & Daddy Yankee, "One Kiss" by Calvin Harris, "Shotgun" by George Ezra,  "Sweet but Psycho" by Ava Max, "Giant" by Calvin Harris & Rag'n'Bone Man, "Senorita" by Shawn Mendes and Camila Cabello and "Dance Monkey" by Tones and I.

Number-one singles

By artist
Eighteen different artists have had at least four number-one singles on the UK Singles Downloads Chart so far during the 2010s. The totals below include only credited performances, and do not include appearances on charity ensembles such as Helping Haiti or The X Factor finalists.

By weeks at number one
Twenty nine different artists have spent seven or more weeks at the top of the UK Singles Downloads Chart so far during the 2010s. The totals below include only credited performances, and do not include appearances on charity ensembles such as Helping Haiti or The X Factor finalists.

By record label
Seven record labels have spent 10 weeks or more so far at number one during the 2010s.

External links
Official Singles Downloads Chart at the Official Charts Company
The Official UK Download Chart at MTV UK

2010s in British music
United Kingdom Singles Download
Download 2010s